Mirabad (also Romanized as Mīrābād) is a village in Haq Rural District, Nalus District, Oshnavieh County, West Azerbaijan Province, Iran. At the 2006 census, its population was 1,041, in 185 families.

References 

Populated places in Oshnavieh County